The Frisco League is a high school athletic conference consisting of nine high schools in Mid-Missouri.  All the schools in the conference are Class 2 and 3, a norm for small rural schools in the area.  The league takes its name from the St. Louis – San Francisco Railway (the Frisco), which was, and still is, a major presence in the area— especially before the birth of Route 66.

The league officially offers championships for girls in Basketball, Cross Country, Softball, Track & Field and Volleyball.  And for boys the league officially sponsors championships in Baseball, Basketball, Cross Country, Soccer and Track & Field.  Some schools sponsor sports that are not sponsored by the league but are sponsored by the Missouri State High School Activities Association, such as Golf, Tennis and Girls soccer.

The league is also somewhat unusual among those in Missouri in that it offers official fall baseball and spring softball competition.

List of member schools

*The class in which a school competes depends on the size of the school, and the particular sport or activity.  Most activities (for example softball, track, cross country) compete in four classes, but basketball competes in five and football in six. Because basketball is by far the most popular sport in the state in regards to school participation, MSHSAA officially uses the five-class system to classify schools.

History
The league was organized in Lebanon in 1924 by future governor of Missouri Phil M. Donnelly, a Lebanon attorney.  Teams in the league represented Lebanon, Stoutland, Richland, Crocker, Linn Creek, Conway, Niangua and Marshfield. That league was known as the Frisco High School Athletic Association.

The league was composed of those area schools whose major sport was basketball, but who did not have an indoor court.  Another requirement was that none of the conference schools could have a football program because of obvious scheduling conflicts. Although this is no longer a rule today, none of the Frisco League schools currently have football teams. Iberia had a team in the late 1980s but it was disbanded in 1987.

The Frisco High School Athletic Association gradually became known as the Frisco League.  League competition branched out into baseball, academic areas and other areas.

State championships
Dixon
 1969 Boys Basketball (M)
 1976 Baseball (A)

Iberia
 2001 Baseball (2A)

Licking
 1975 Volleyball
 1979 Volleyball (1A-2A)
 1988 Baseball (2A)
 1989 Baseball (2A)
 1989 Boys Basketball (2A)
 2002 Boys Cross Country (2)

Plato
 2005 Baseball (1)

Richland
 1996 Academic Competition (2A)
 1997 Academic Competition (2A)
 1998 Academic Competition (2A)
 1999 Academic Competition (2A)
 2000 Academic Competition (2A)
 2001 Academic Competition (2A)
 2003 Academic Competition (2)
 2004 Academic Competition (2)
 2005 Academic Competition (2)
 2006 Academic Competition (2)
 2007 Academic Competition (2)
 2008 Academic Competition (2)
 2009 Academic Competition (2)
 2011 Scholar Bowl (2)
 2014 Scholar Bowl (2)

References

External links
 Frisco League website

High school sports conferences and leagues in the United States
Missouri high school athletic conferences